A hellbox is a receptacle where cast metal sorts are thrown after printing. The job of sorting the type from the hellbox and putting it back into the job case was given to the apprentice, known as a printer's devil. Later, when continuous casting or hot metal typesetting machines such as the Linotype and Monotype became popular, the hellbox was used for storing discarded or broken type that were melted down and recast.

References

 The American Heritage Dictionary of the English Language, Fourth Edition, 2000. Houghton Mifflin Company. 
 Fleischman, J (1977). "A Linotypist's Notes: Being an Account of a Brief Apprenticeship in an Obsolete Trade". 

Typesetting
Printing terminology